General elections were held in the Netherlands from 15 to 17 March 2021 to elect all 150 members of the House of Representatives. Following the elections and lengthy coalition formation talks, the sitting government remained in power.

The election had originally been scheduled to take place on 17 March; however, due to the COVID-19 pandemic, the government decided to open some polling stations two days in advance to ensure safe voting for elderly and immunocompromised citizens. Citizens aged 70 years or older were also given the opportunity to vote by post.

The election was held two days before the 2021 Curaçao general election.

Background

Previous election
The 2017 general election was held after a five-year coalition government between the People's Party for Freedom and Democracy (VVD) and Labour Party (PvdA). The PvdA suffered heavy losses in the election, being reduced from 38 to 9 seats, while the VVD lost 8 seats, falling from 41 to 33 but remaining the largest party. The Party for Freedom (PVV) came in second with 20 seats, 5 more than it won in the 2012 election, while the Christian Democratic Appeal (CDA) gained 6 seats to win 19 in total. Democrats 66 (D66) gained 7 to win 19, GroenLinks (GL) gained 10 to win 14, and the Socialist Party (SP) lost 1 to win 14. The election also saw two new parties, Denk and Forum for Democracy (FvD), enter the House of Representatives, winning 3 and 2 seats, respectively. Four other smaller parties maintained representation in the lower chamber: Christian Union (CU) and Party for the Animals (PvdD) with 5 seats each, 50PLUS with 4 seats, and the Reformed Political Party (SGP) with 3 seats. 

The third Rutte cabinet was inaugurated after the longest coalition formation in Dutch history, with 225 days between the election and the cabinet being sworn in. The cabinet was led by Prime Minister Mark Rutte, who presided over a coalition consisting of the People's Party for Freedom and Democracy (VVD), Christian Democratic Appeal (CDA), Democrats 66 (D66) and Christian Union (CU). The coalition held a narrow majority in both legislative chambers at the time of the cabinet's inauguration, with 76 of 150 seats in the House of Representatives and 38 of 75 seats in the Senate. Following the 2019 Senate election, it had a minority of 32 seats in the upper chamber. After Wybren van Haga was expelled from the VVD faction in 2019, the coalition lost its majority in the House of Representatives. On 15 January 2021, two months before the election, the third Rutte cabinet resigned following a parliamentary inquiry into the Dutch childcare benefits scandal, and continued as a demissionary cabinet.

Electoral system

Pursuant to articles C.1, C.2 and C.3 of the electoral law, elections for the House of Representatives take place every four years in March. The 150 members of the House of Representatives are elected by open list proportional representation. The number of seats per list is determined using the D'Hondt method, effectively resulting in an electoral threshold of 1/150th (0.67%) of votes to secure a seat. Voters have the option to cast a preferential vote. The seats won by a list are first allocated to the candidates who, in preferential votes, have received at least 25 percent of the number of votes needed for one seat (effectively 0.17% of the total votes), regardless of their placement on the electoral list. If multiple candidates from a list pass this threshold, their ordering is determined based on the number of votes received. Any remaining seats are allocated to candidates according to their placement on the electoral list.

Participating parties
A record number of 89 parties registered with the Electoral Council in order to compete in the election. Most parties, however, did not achieve (nationwide) ballot access, as they were not able to pay the €11,250 deposit and/or did not receive enough endorsements (30 for each of the 19 electoral districts in the European Netherlands, and 10 for the Caribbean Netherlands).   

The following 37 parties met the requirements to participate in the election:

Campaign

Debates

Opinion polls

Results

The left-wing parties - Socialist Party, Labour Party and GroenLinks - total less than 20 per cent of the vote. According to political scientist Cas Mudde, the steady decline of the left since 2006 can be explained mainly by a media agenda dominated by societal issues, especially identity issues, at the expense of economic and social issues. The fraction of unrepresented vote due to the natural electoral threshold is 1.99%.

The official results were published by the Electoral Council on 26 March 2021.

By province

Government formation

Rutte claimed the result was a vote of confidence in the VVD and has ruled out a coalition with the PVV and FvD. He was expected to form a four-party government with D66, CDA, and smaller parties. On 23 March, Rutte said that he preferred a coalition with the new right-wing party called JA21, which has eight seats in the Senate that can help form a government majority in both chambers; however, this proposal could potentially meet with resistance from D66 due to disagreements on issues such as climate change, EU integration, and migration policies. If a coalition were formed including CU, there would be differences on medico-ethical issues with D66. Rutte could also potentially speak to left-wing parties, such as the SP, PvdA, GL, or Volt, if other attempts fail. SP leader Lilian Marijnissen said that it was very unlikely that she would join a VVD-led coalition but did not rule it out completely. PvdA leader Lilianne Ploumen said she would want to sit alone with another party, while GL leader Jesse Klaver said he is open to a progressive coalition with VVD and D66, despite the party's poor election performance.

While Rutte was in the process of negotiations to form a new coalition, informateur Kajsa Ollongren (D66) was photographed by a journalist of the Algemeen Nederlands Persbureau as she was leaving Parliament with a document from the coalition negotiations under her arm. The document contained the note "position elsewhere" next to the name of Pieter Omtzigt of the CDA, who has been a vocal critic of Rutte and played a key role in exposing the child welfare scandal that forced the resignation of Rutte's previous cabinet. This photograph caused speculation about whether Rutte was planning to sideline Omtzigt, but Rutte initially denied any involvement in the matter. After further notes emerged confirming he had discussed the possibility of Omtzigt as minister, he said he had "misremembered", and was accused by numerous opposition leaders of having lied to the media and the Dutch people. Parliament held a vote of no-confidence in Rutte as prime minister, which narrowly failed, but D66 and the CDA, which served in Rutte's previous cabinet, instead submitted a motion of censure against Rutte as parliamentary leader; this motion was passed by a large majority, with only Rutte's own VVD voting against. Informateurs Wouter Koolmees (D66) and Tamara van Ark (VVD) resigned after the scandal, and were replaced by veteran informateur Herman Tjeenk Willink (PvdA). On September 7, Johan Remkes was appointed as informateur. On September 30, the four parties from the previous governing coalition, the VVD, D66, CDA, and CU, agreed to negotiate forming the same coalition again. After long coalition talks, the four parties agreed to present their coalition agreement on 15 December 2021. With a coalition officially formed, the Fourth Rutte cabinet was inaugurated on 10 January 2022.

References 

Netherlands
Elections in Bonaire
Elections in Saba (island)
Elections in Sint Eustatius
General elections in the Netherlands
March 2021 events in the Netherlands
General
Netherlands